Urzhumovo is a rural locality (a village) in Yudinskoye Rural Settlement, Velikoustyugsky District, Vologda Oblast, Russia. The population was 2 as of 2002.

Geography 
Urzhumovo is located 12 km northeast of Veliky Ustyug (the district's administrative centre) by road. Sokolovo is the nearest rural locality.

References 

Rural localities in Velikoustyugsky District